Marc Bernard (6 September 1900 in Nîmes – 15 November 1983 in Nîmes), was a French writer, the winner of the French literary prize Prix Interallié for Anny in 1943 and of the Prix Goncourt in 1942 for Pareils à des enfants.

Life
Born in a working-class family, he became a delivery boy at age 12, then a metal worker. In 1929 he published a novel, Zig-zag, inspired by the surrealist movement, which brought him to the attention of Henri Barbusse. During the 1930s he wrote for Monde, a pro-communist newspaper, as a critic. He also co-authored short, sometimes intimate essays with his wife Else Reichman. The latter was an Austrian expatriate who held a PhD in literature but suffered from melanoma. A strong proponent of working-class literature, he founded "Le groupe des écrivains prolétariens" (The Group of Working-Class Writers) in 1932. For a short period he hosted a literary radio talkshow on National Radio.

During the 1960s he wrote for the "Figaro littéraire" (the weekly literary supplement to the daily newspaper Le Figaro).

In 1970 he was awarded the Grand Prix Poncetton for his work in general.

Works 
 1929 - Zig-zag
 1931 - Au secours
 1934 - Anny
 1936 - Rencontres
 1939 - La Conquête de la Méditerranée
 1939 - Les Exilés
 1941 -  Pareils à des enfants
 1945 - Vert-et-argent
 1946 - Les Voix
 1947 - La Zone - conté inédit, illustré par Jean Boullet. Edité au benefice du Comité de L'Enfance Inadoptée de Nimes
 1949 - La Cendre
 1950 - Une Journée toute simple
 1953 -  Vacances
 1955 - Salut, camarades
 1957 - La Bonne humeur
 1961 - Le Carafon
 1964 - Sarcellopolis
 1970 -  Mayorquinas
 1972 - La Mort de la bien-aimée
 1976 - Au-delà de l'absence
 1977 - Les Marionnettes
 1979 - Tout est bien ainsi
 1984 - Au fil des jours

1900 births
1983 deaths
People from Nîmes
20th-century French non-fiction writers
20th-century French male writers
Writers from Occitania (administrative region)
Prix Goncourt winners
Prix Interallié winners